Wild Girl or The Wild Girl(s) or Wildgirl may refer to:

Films
 The Wild Girl (1917 film), a 1917 American comedy drama film directed by Howard Estabrook
 The Wild Girl (1925 film), a 1925 American drama film directed by William Bletcher
 The Wild Girl, a 2010 Hallmark Movie Channel original movie
 Wild Girl (film) (1932)

Printed media
 Wild Girl (comics) (2000s)
 The Wild Girl (1984), novel by Michèle Roberts
 The Wild Girl (2006), children's book by Christopher Wormell 
 The Wild Girl (2006), novel by Jim Fergus
 The Wild Girls (2011), a short story collection by Ursula K. Le Guin
 The Wild Girls (2008), children's novel by Pat Murphy

Other uses
 Wildgirl, artist and former WFMU DJ